Sangharsh (Marathi:संघर्ष ) is a 2014 Marathi film produced by Vidnyan Siddhi Films Ltd. It features an ensemble star cast and revolves around the lives of the residents of Gunaji Chawl and how they get caught in the politician-underworld nexus. The film was released on 7 February 2014.

Plot
Best friends Bhau, Manya and Tavlya are the soul of Gunaji Chawl. Bhau is a karate black belt champion; Manya is a fabulous dancer and dreams of winning a dance reality show and Tavlya has no mission in life but to play practical jokes on people around him and imitate them.

The trio's life takes an unexpected turn when they get into a brawl with a few goons. They find themselves caught in a conflict which pitches them against a politician, an underworld don and some corrupt police officers.

In the due course of time, they find themselves slipping deeper into murky waters and soon realize of a devious conspiracy against the common man.

Will the trio triumph? Let us find out in this marathon journey of love, courage and endurance - Sangharsh.

Cast
Ravi Shinde alias Bhau – Rajesh Shringarpure
Sakshi – Sangeeta Kapure
Bijli – Prajakta Mali
Manya – Nakul Ghanekar
Tavlya – Anshuman Vichare
Radhika – Madhavi Nimkar
Avinash Waghmare – Devdatta Nage
Mangala Tai – Sulabha Arya
Gurav Kaka – Arun Nalawade
Mai – Amita Khopkar
Raghubhai – Sushant Shelar
Prataprao – Dr. Vilas Ujawane
Inspector Kalokhe – Ajay Purkar
Bala – Sunil Deo
Bavlya – PankajKhamkar
Inspector Bhosale – Rajesh Kamble
PratapraoPA – Nilesh Suryavanshi
Ingale – Sudhir Pednekar
Baban - Ashruba
Hero - Akshay veer

Crew
Producer - Vidnyan Siddhi Films Ltd.
Director–Saisparsh
Executive Director–R. Viraj
Executive Producer–Mangesh Jagtap
Screenplay & Dialogues–R. Viraj
Story–Saisparsh
Cinematographer –Sandy
Music–Nishikant Sadaphule, Bapi –Tutul
Lyrics – Saisparsh, Ashwini Shende, Nishikant Sadaphule 
Choreographers –Saroj Khan, Rajeev Surti, Raju Khan, Ranju Varghese
Editor–Nilesh Gawand
Action - Javed – Aejaz
Art Director–Jaywant Waingankar

Soundtrack

References

External links
 http://divyamarathi.bhaskar.com/article/BOL-sangharsh-first-look-launched-4449075-PHO.html

2014 films
2010s Marathi-language films